The Kill Reflex also known as Soda Cracker is a 1989 American action-crime film directed by and starring Fred Williamson. The movie was written by Jaron Summers based on his own novel and was released in the United States on June 1, 1989.

Plot
Soda Cracker, a veteran cop must unveil the mysterious murder of his former partner while fights against the mafia and corrupt policemen.

Cast
 Fred Williamson as Soda Cracker
 Maud Adams as Crystal Tarver
 Bo Svenson as Ivan Moss
 Phyllis Hyman as Irene
 D.R. Jones as Ace Moss
 Julie Gregg as Nancy Gillespie

Release

Reception
SteveQ from the blog "Down Among the Z Movies" called "The Kill Reflex", Williamson's worst movie and wrote: "Fred Williamson has been in a number of entertaining blaxploitation films, but this one, which he also directed, is a mess." In the website "Bulletproof Action", the reviewer stated: "Soda Cracker is not going to win any sort of groundbreaking trailblazer awards. It features elements we have seen time and time again in cop related action flicks and unless you are a big Fred Williamson fan, I wouldn’t go out of my way to watch Soda Cracker. This one is nestled right in between below average and not worth watching."

References

External links
 
 

1980s crime action films
1980s action thriller films
American crime action films
American action thriller films
1980s English-language films
1980s American films